Erbessa is a genus of moths of the family Notodontidae. It consists of the following species:
Erbessa albilinea  Miller, 2008
Erbessa alea  (Druce, 1890) 
Erbessa augusta  (Warren, 1909) 
Erbessa avara  (Druce, 1899) 
Erbessa basivitta  (Prout, 1918) 
Erbessa biplagiata  (Warren, 1897) 
Erbessa capena  Druce, 1885
Erbessa cassandra  (Druce, 1885) 
Erbessa celata  (Warren, 1906) 
Erbessa cingulina  (Druce, 1885) 
Erbessa citrina  Druce, 1898
Erbessa clite  (Walker, 1854) 
Erbessa conigera  (Prout, 1918) 
Erbessa continens  (Prout, 1918) 
Erbessa corvica  (Dognin, 1923) 
Erbessa cuneiplaga  (Prout, 1918) 
Erbessa decolorata  (Hering, 1925) 
Erbessa depravata  (Hering, 1925) 
Erbessa desmotrichoides  (Hering, 1925) 
Erbessa dominula  (Warren, 1909) 
Erbessa euryzona  (Prout, 1922) 
Erbessa evippe  (Walker, 1854) 
Erbessa evippoides  (Hering, 1925) 
Erbessa graba  (Druce, 1899) 
Erbessa inaria  (Druce, 1885) 
Erbessa integra  (C. and R. Felder, 1874) 
Erbessa josia  (C. and R. Felder, 1862) 
Erbessa labana  (Druce, 1895) 
Erbessa lamasi  Miller, 2008
Erbessa leechi  (Prout, 1918) 
Erbessa lindigii  (C. and R. Felder, 1874) 
Erbessa longiplaga  (Warren, 1907) 
Erbessa macropoecila  (Hering, 1925) 
Erbessa maera  (Schaus, 1892) 
Erbessa mimica  (Hering, 1925) 
Erbessa mitys  (Druce, 1899) 
Erbessa ovia  (Druce, 1893) 
Erbessa pales  (Druce, 1893) 
Erbessa papula  (Dognin, 1923) 
Erbessa primula  (Dognin, 1919) 
Erbessa priverna  (Cramer, 1777) 
Erbessa projecta  (Warren, 1909) 
Erbessa prolifera  (Walker, 1854) 
Erbessa prouti  (Hering, 1925) 
Erbessa pyraloides  (Walker, 1854) 
Erbessa quadricolor  (Walker, 1856) 
Erbessa regis  (Hering, 1925) 
Erbessa saga  (Hering, 1925) 
Erbessa salvini  (C. and R. Felder, 1874) 
Erbessa seducta  (Prout, 1918) 
Erbessa semimarginata  (Dognin, 1902) 
Erbessa semiplaga  (Warren, 1905) 
Erbessa sobria  Walker, 1854
Erbessa stroudi  Miller, 2008
Erbessa tapajoza  (Dognin, 1923) 
Erbessa tegyroides  Miller, 2008
Erbessa thiaucourti  Miller, 2008
Erbessa umbrifera  (Walker, 1854) 
Erbessa unimacula  (Warren, 1907) 
Erbessa ursula  (Hering, 1925) 

Notodontidae of South America